Olga Shevchenko is a Russian ski-orienteering competitor and world champion. She won a gold medal in the relay event at the World Ski Orienteering Championships in Moscow in 2007, together with Natalia Tomilova and Tatiana Vlasova. She received a bronze medal in the long distance in Levi in 2005.

She finished third in the overall World Cup in Ski Orienteering in 2007/2008, behind Tatiana Vlasova  Liisa Anttila.

References

Year of birth missing (living people)
Living people
Russian orienteers
Female orienteers
Ski-orienteers